Monohorgonj (Bengali: মনোহরগন্জ) is an upazila of Comilla District in the Division of Chittagong, Bangladesh.

History 
The upazila was formed in 2005 with 11 unions in the southern region known as the watershed of the greater Laksam upazila.

Demographics 

At the time of the 2011 census, Manoharganj Upazila had a population of 244,943 living in 44,847 households. Manoharganj Upazila had a population growth rate of 16.19% over the decade 2001-2011. It had a literacy rate of 50.41% and a sex ratio of 1180 females to 1000 males. 0.49% of the population lives in urban areas.

Geography

Monohorgonj Upazila is located in the southern part of Comilla District in Bangladesh. The Dakatia River runs through the upazila. This upazila is bounded by Laksam upazila on the north, Nangalkot upazila on the east, Senbagh upazila of Noakhali district on the south-east, Sonaimuri upazila of Noakhali district on the south, Chatkhil upazila of Noakhali district on the southwest and Shahrasti upazila of Chandpur district on the west.

Manoharganj Upazila Complex (Upazila Parisahd) is located at Khodai Vita on the south side of Manoharganj Bazar along the banks of Dakatiya river.

Rivers 

Notable and only river of this Upazila is Dakatiya river. This Upazila is situated on the banks of this river. A dam has been built by the Water Development Board toward one side of the waterway close to the Upazila. Once this river was the main medium of communication with Monohorgonj Upazila. Even today, goods are being transported thorugh that river on a certain limited scale.

Administration 
Monohorgonj Upazila is divided into 11 union parishads: Baishgaon, Bipulashar, Hasnabad, Jhalam Dakshin, Jhalam Uttar, Khela, Lokkhanpur, Moishatua, Natherpetua, Shoroshpur, and Uttar Howla. The union parishads are subdivided into 145 mauzas and 181 villages.

Education 
Currently there are 2 government colleges, 2 private colleges, 1 government high school, 27 total high schools, 26 madrasas, 105 government primary schools. The literacy rate of this Upazila is:
 Average-48.74%
 Male-50.38%
 Female-47.19%

Economy 
The economy of this upazila is largely dependent on agriculture. No natural assets, for example, oil, gas, or coal mineshafts were found in this Upazila. The people of this territory make a living by creating agricultural products, grains, and fishing.

See also
 Upazilas of Bangladesh
 Districts of Bangladesh
 Divisions of Bangladesh

References

 
Upazilas of Comilla District